Thomas Pinckney Bryan Jr. (October 10, 1918 – March 28, 1983) was an American lawyer and politician who served in the Virginia House of Delegates. Elected in 1967 to represent Richmond in the House, he was defeated in 1969 by pharmacist Carl E. Bain. He served on the Richmond City Council from 1952 to 1958, including 2 years as the city's mayor.

References

External links

1918 births
1983 deaths
Democratic Party members of the Virginia House of Delegates
20th-century American politicians
Mayors of Richmond, Virginia
Politicians from Richmond, Virginia
University of Virginia alumni
University of Richmond School of Law alumni